Clarence William Joseph Tolson (17 November 1911 – 24 June 1989) was an Australian rules footballer who played with Collingwood in the Victorian Football League (VFL).

Notes

External links 

Clarrie Tolson's profile at Collingwood Forever

1911 births
1989 deaths
Australian rules footballers from Victoria (Australia)
Collingwood Football Club players